Legio XXII Primigenia ("Fortune's Twenty-Second Legion") was a legion of the Imperial Roman army dedicated to the goddess Fortuna Primigenia. Founded in AD 39 by the emperor Caligula for use in his campaigns in Germania, the XXII Primigenia spent much of their time in Mogontiacum (modern Mainz) up to the end of the 3rd century. The legion's symbols were a Capricorn and the demigod Hercules.

History

XXII Primigenia was first stationed in Mogontiacum in the Roman province of Germania Superior, guarding the Rhine border as part of the limes. Along with the rest of the Germanic army, the legion supported Vitellius in the Year of the Four Emperors (69). During the Batavian rebellion, XXII Primigenia, commanded by Gaius Dillius Vocula, was the only Germanic legion that survived rebel attacks and which stayed in its camp, defending Moguntiacum. They remained in Moguntiacum until at least the 3rd century. Hadrian, prior to becoming Emperor, was tribunus militum of the XXIIth in 97–98.

Around 90 units of the XXII were garrisoned in or around the area of modern-day Butzbach, as part of the Limes Germanicus (a series of forts along the Roman frontier of Germania Superior. A stamp of the XXII Legion was found during excavations of a Roman Fort in Butzbach. The 22nd U.S. Infantry Regiment was stationed in Butzbach after World War II, and the stamp of the Legion and the emblem of the American unit were very similar.

The Rhine settlement was their main camp, but vexillationes of the legion participated in the building of the Antonine Wall in Scotland (2nd century) and in the campaigns against the Sassanid Empire (around 235).

They were still in Moguntiacum during the attack of the tribe of the Alamanni in 235, and were responsible for the assassination of Emperor Alexander Severus when he tried to negotiate with the enemy, along with the subsequent election of Maximinus Thrax as new emperor.

In 268, Primigenia probably fought under Gallienus at the Battle of Naissus, winning a victory over the Goths. The following year, the XXII Legion rebelled against Postumus, and proclaimed its commander Laelianus Emperor of the Gallic Empire.

In the beginning of the fourth century the legion was awarded the title "Primigenia CV" (presumably Constantiana Victrix). There is no record of it after the reign of Constantine the Great (r.306–337). One source suggests that it "may have been destroyed during the Battle of Mursa."

Attested members

Epigraphic inscriptions

- Dis Manibus Avidiae Nice uxori rarissimi exempli Publicius Apronianus hastatus legionis XXII Primigeniae fecit. Tarragona (Tarraco), Spain. .
- Amoena hic sita est Quintus Antonius Avitus veteranus legionis XXII Primigeniae faciendum (...). Lisboa, Portugal.  .
- (...) tribuno militum legionis XXII Primigeniae praefecto cohortium in Germania / MIL(...). Beja, Portugal. IRCP 235.

See also 
 List of Roman legions

References

External links 
 French Legio XXII Primigenia -  you can view a large number of pictures concerning this reenactment group in France and Europe
 Official website of legio 22 reenactement group

22 Primigenia
39 establishments
Military units and formations established in the 1st century
30s establishments in the Roman Empire
30s establishments